The Meadowlark Ultralight Meadowlark is an American ultralight aircraft that was designed by Jim Higgs and produced by the Meadowlark Ultralight Corporation. The Meadowlark was supplied only as a factory completed aircraft.

Design and development
It features a strut-braced high-wing, a single-seat, open cockpit, tricycle landing gear and a single engine in tractor configuration.

The aircraft fuselage is made from aluminum tubing. Its  span wing is constructed in a similar manner to the Ultraflight Lazair's wing. It is built from D-cell spar and leading edge, with foam ribs bonded to the spar. The wing is then covered with transparent Mylar film for covering. The wing incorporates a quick-folding mechanism that allows it to be folded back along the fuselage for ground transport or for storage. The pilot is accommodated on an open seat without a windshield. The landing gear features suspension on all wheels and a steerable nosewheel.

Due to its introduction just before the collapse of the US ultralight industry in 1984, the design was not a commercial success and only a small number were completed and sold.

Specifications (Meadowlark)

References

External links
Photo of a Meadowlark

1980s United States ultralight aircraft
Homebuilt aircraft
Single-engined tractor aircraft